Tropical Storm Haikui, known in the Philippines as Tropical Storm Salome, was a weak tropical cyclone that affected the Philippine archipelagos of Luzon and Visayas. Forming as the twenty-fourth named storm of the 2017 typhoon season, Haikui developed as a tropical depression to the east of Samar on November 9. Traversing some Philippine islands, the system gradually intensified into a named tropical storm by November 10. In that same day, Haikui emerged to the South China Sea.

Meteorological history

On November 8, a tropical disturbance had developed about 709 km (441 mi) southeast of Sorsogon. After some organization, the Joint Typhoon Warning Center (JTWC) issued a Tropical Cyclone Formation Alert. By 00:00 UTC of November 9, the PAGASA began tracking on the system, giving the local name Salome. The JTWC issued their first advisory on Salome three hours later, designating the system as 30W. The Japan Meteorological Agency (JMA) followed suit a few hours later, as they classified it as a tropical depression with winds of 55 km/h (35 mph). Satellite imagery found a consolidating low-level circulation center (LLCC) with convective banding wrapping into it. By 12:00 UTC of the same day, the JMA upgraded the system to a tropical storm, naming it Haikui, the twenty-fourth named storm of the season. Around the same time it was named, the PAGASA indicated that Haikui made landfall in San Juan, Batangas.

While traversing Southern Luzon, Haikui's LLCC became defined while its structure had greatly improved with a convective structure. Despite a slight deterioration of its structure with some warming in its cloud tops, Haikui was located over in a favorable environment with "very" warm sea-surface temperatures of 30 °C (86 °F), a low shear and a pronounced poleward outflow. By November 10, the JTWC finally upgraded Haikui to a tropical storm after a sudden burst of deep convection occurred near its center.

Preparations and impact

Philippines
On November 9, as soon as the PAGASA started issuing advisories on the system, Tropical Cyclone Signal #1 was raised to 15 provinces over in the Bicol Region, Western Visayas and Calabarzon. The National Disaster Risk Reduction and Management Council (NDRRMC) had immediately announced to suspend all trips from the Batangas Port. Warning was also raised for sea travel over in the storm signal-raised areas due to moderate and rough seas. By November 10, the PAGASA had raised the Tropical Cyclone Signal #2 over in Metro Manila, Laguna and Batangas after Haikui (Salome) strengthened into a tropical storm. Any other tropical cyclone signals were also extended to Central Luzon (Region III) and provinces of Zambales. Estimated rainfall was ranging from the categories of moderate to heavy within the 250 km-diameter of the storm. The public and management councils were already advised to take actions. The PAGASA had also warned on possibilities of further landslides and flooding to provinces further north, especially in the Ilocos Region (Region I) and the Cagayan Valley (Region II). Classes over in the capital region and nearby cities and provinces were suspended on November 10.

Some domestic and international flights were canceled on November 9. More than 700 passengers were stranded over in ports of Southern Luzon and Eastern Visayas. The Office of Civil Defense of Mimaropa region stated that 247 of those were over in Mindoro. About 13 boats were destroyed in Tabaco City, Albay due to rough current. However two boats carrying passengers and cargoes were stopped over in the Balanacan Port in Marinduque. The storm also caused some landslides and rockslides to occur in Samar, which blocked major roads. Nine villages in Batangas also experienced power outages as well as rising water levels of the Calumpang River, prompting nearby residents to prepare and evacuate. In Siniloan, Laguna, 15 barangays were flooded with a landslide that covered and damaged a house. Camarines Sur also experienced damaged agricultural crops due to flooding as well as knocked-down trees due to gusty winds. An extra 300 passengers were stranded along a port in Romblon. As of November 11, the Department of Social Welfare and Development (DWSD) had recorded a total of 126 families who were affected by the storm, while 10 families were still staying in an evacuation center in Dipaculao, Aurora.

On November 14, the NDRRMC had recorded a total of 15 suspended classes over in some regions during November 9–10. Seven road sections were not passable and in Dipaculao, Aurora, five houses were damaged. Majority of the damages were recorded over in the region of Calabarzon and was totaled up to Php218.5 million (US$4.26 million).

China
On November 13 and 14, Haikui produced heavy, sustained rain in the island province of Hainan, China. Flooding was recorded in several locations on the east side of the province. In the capital Haikou, flooding caused road closure.

See also 

Weather of 2017
Tropical cyclones in 2017
Tropical Storm Merbok (2004)
Tropical Depression Winnie (2004)
Tropical Storm Tokage (2016)
Tropical Storm Sonca (2017)
Typhoon Doksuri (2017)

References

External links

30W.HAIKUI from the U.S. Naval Research Laboratory

2017 Pacific typhoon season
Typhoons in the Philippines
Typhoons in Vietnam
2017 disasters in the Philippines
2017 disasters in Vietnam
November 2017 events in Asia
Haikui
Western Pacific tropical storms